B.L. Stryker is an American detective drama that aired on ABC from February 13, 1989, to May 5, 1990, as part of the ABC Mystery Movie umbrella group, along with Columbo, and Kojak. Tom Selleck was one of the series' executive producers. The series starred Burt Reynolds, Ossie Davis, Dana Kaminski and Rita Moreno. Reynolds also directed several of the episodes. Each B.L. Stryker episode was two hours long, and took approximately a month to film. The first season of BLStryker was seven, two hour episodes that aired every three weeks, broadcast on Monday nights from 9PM to 11 PM, on ABC. In the second season, the show was aired on Saturday nights.

Premise
Reynolds portrays Buddy Lee Stryker, aka B.L., a Vietnam war vet and retired New Orleans police officer who has moved back home to the other side of the tracks in Palm Beach, Florida, and is working as a private investigator. Stryker lives on a houseboat and drives an old Cadillac, and occasionally scrapes up a client while trying to avoid being relocated for not paying his slip fees.

Cast
 Burt Reynolds as B.L. Stryker
 Ossie Davis as Oz Jackson, Stryker's best friend and a former boxer
 Rita Moreno as Kimberly Baskin, Stryker's ex-wife (6 episodes)
 Dana Kaminski, as “Lyynda Lennox” was a series regular, starting in BL Stryker's second episode.and throughout the two seasons on ABC, as Stryker's assistant. (11 episodes)
 Michael O. Smith as Chief McGee
 Alfie Wise as Oliver Wardell, diminutive owner of the marina at which Stryker's boat is moored, and frequently Stryker's comic foil
 James C. Lewis as Captain Cartrude, Palm Beach police (10 episodes)

Production
Reynolds decided to return to television after appearing in a number of mediocre movies. The deal came together very fast; ABC approached Reynolds and he agreed to make it in two days. Reynolds says he was attracted by the fact the series gave him six months off and considerable creative control, and it would be shot in Florida where he lived.

Episodes

Season 1 (1989)

Season 2 (1989–90)

Home media
The complete 12-episode series was released on Region 1 DVD from Arts Alliance America in a 7-disc set.

References

External links
 

1989 American television series debuts
1990 American television series endings
American Broadcasting Company original programming
Television series by Universal Television
Television series created by Christopher Crowe (screenwriter)
English-language television shows
The ABC Mystery Movie
American detective television series